Baliochila singularis, the Lannin's buff, is a butterfly in the family Lycaenidae. It is found in Botswana and Zimbabwe. Its habitat consists of bushveld and Brachystegia woodland.

There are two distinct seasonal forms. The wet-season form (f. martyni) and the dry-season form. Adults have been recorded near a Heteropyxis natalensis tree, where they were imbibing the secretions of membracids that were feeding on the tree.

The larvae feed on algae (cyanobacteria) growing on trees.

References

Butterflies described in 1953
Poritiinae